The year 1952 in archaeology involved some significant events.

Explorations
 Site of Kerkouane discovered by Charles Saumagne.
 Archaeological exploration of Maijishan Grottoes begins.

Excavations
 Alberto Ruz Lhuillier opens the tomb of Pacal the Great at Palenque.
 Major excavations begin at Viking burial site of Lindholm Høje.
 Excavations at Jericho led by Kathleen Kenyon begin (continues to 1958).
 Excavations at the Palace of Nestor in Pylos resume (first started in 1939) by Carl Blegen (continues to 1969).
 Oscar Broneer discovers and begins excavations of the Temple of Poseidon in Isthmia.

Publications
 J. G. D. Clark - Prehistoric Europe: the Economic Basis.
 David Knowles and J. K. S. St Joseph - Monastic Sites from the Air.

Finds
 In Schleswig, Germany, Windeby I and Windeby II, bog bodies, were discovered in a peat bog during a span of three months. 
 Another bog body, known as "Grauballe Man" is discovered in Grauballe, Denmark.

Events
Grahame Clark is elected to the Disney Professorship of Archaeology in the University of Cambridge.
August 23 - Glyn Daniel begins to present Animal, Vegetable, Mineral? on BBC Television, a game show often featuring other archaeologists and archaeological artefacts.
 Michael Ventris deciphers Minoan Linear B.

Births
 March 30 - Alan Vince, British archaeologist (d. 2009)

Deaths
 Alfred Foucher, French scholar and archaeologist (b. 1865)

References

Archaeology
Archaeology
Archaeology by year